The International was a competition held from 1929 at Wimbledon Stadium. It was originally a race between the English Greyhound Derby, Welsh Greyhound Derby and Scottish Greyhound Derby winners. The first winner was the legendary Mick The Miller who defeated Back Isle and Cleveralitz on 19 October. 

From 1986 until 2003 the race was known as the Byrne International because it was sponsored by owner/trainer Patsy Byrne.

Past winners

Distances 
1929-1929  (550 yards)
1936-1974  (500 yards)
1975-2002  (460 metres)

Sponsors
1986-2002 Patsy Byrne

References

Greyhound racing competitions in the United Kingdom
Greyhound racing in London